Orny Adams (born Adam Jason Orenstein on November 10, 1970) is an American actor, comedy writer and stand-up comic. He is best known for his role as Coach Bobby Finstock for the MTV series Teen Wolf.

Personal life
Adams was born in Lexington, Massachusetts. He was raised in a Conservative Judaism household, and at summers he attended Camp Tel Noar in nearby New Hampshire. He has two sisters. In 2018, Adams and his family visited Israel for the first time.

He graduated from Lexington High School in 1989, then earned a bachelor's degree from Emory University in 1993, majoring in political science and philosophy.

Career

Adams has made appearances on The Tonight Show with Jay Leno. He was featured in the 2002 documentary Comedian (film)  starring Jerry Seinfeld.

Adams' comedy DVD/CD Path of Most Resistance was released on November 10, 2006.  On October 29, 2010, Adams' one-hour comedy special Orny Adams Takes The Third premiered on Comedy Central. On December 1, 2017, Adams' third comedy special, Orny Adams: More Than Loud, premiered on Showtime.

In 2007, CBS Television Distribution and Yahoo! announced a development deal with Ashton Kutcher’s production company Katalyst for Tube, which was to have been hosted by Adams and featured viral videos, comedy bits and sketches. In 2011, Adams was cast as Coach Bobby Finstock for the MTV series Teen Wolf. It was originally announced that he would not be returning to the show beyond season 5 to focus more on his comedy, but would return for the last ten episodes of season 5. However, he ended up reprising the role in several episodes of season 6, even appearing in the series' final episode.

In September 2021, it was announced that a reunion film for 2011 Teen Wolf television series had been ordered by Paramount+, with Jeff Davis returning as a screenwriter and executive producer for the film. The majority of the original cast members, including Adams himself, will reprise their roles. The film was released on January 26, 2023.

Filmography

References

Further reading 
 Dixit, Jay. "Orny Adams on Failure" Psychology Today, June 29, 2009

External links 
 
 

1970 births
Living people
20th-century American comedians
21st-century American comedians
21st-century American male actors
American male comedians
American male television actors
Comedians from Massachusetts
Emory University alumni
Jewish American male comedians
Lexington High School alumni
Male actors from Massachusetts
People from Lexington, Massachusetts